This is a list of hospitals and medical facilities in the city of Lagos, Nigeria.

References

 
Hospitals
Lagos
Healthcare in Lagos
Lagos